Marxist Workers' School (MASCH) was an educational institute founded in the winter of 1925 in Berlin, by the Berlin city office of the Communist Party of Germany (KPD). Its function was to enable workers to learn the basics of proletarian life and struggle, to teach the basic tenets of Marxism. It was co-founded by Hermann Duncker, Johann Lorenz Schmidt and Eduard Alexander. Hermann Duncker became the director of school. The school became very successful and by 1930, it had 4000 students in 200 courses, which prompted KPD officials to build 30 other schools in German cities e.g. Dresden and Chemnitz. After the seizure of power by the National Socialists in the spring of 1933, the schools were closed.

History
The school was created in the tradition of the workers cultural movement with its commercial and Workers' Education Associations ("Arbeiterbildungsverein"). Following the reprisals of the Anti-Socialist Laws, social democratic and worker's associations were newly founded as training associations. Proletarian associations opened workers' libraries, e.g. in 1861 in Leipzig, where August Bebel was chairman of the library commission of the local workers' association. He formulated the goal of taking knowledge, art and culture away from bourgeoisie guardianship and "extracting from existing knowledge what benefited the working-class revolutionary struggle for emancipation."

After the separation of the Independent Social Democratic Party of Germany from the Social Democratic Party of Germany in 1914 and founding of the KPD on 30 December 1918, communists in Germany pursued the goal of a socialist revolution similar to the October Revolution in Russia in 1917. The educational work of the KPD was haphazard in the early years, following its formation. In the party congress of October 1919, leading members of the KPD including Duncker, Clara Zetkin and Edwin Hoernle pointed out the need to train party members. Social Democrat hiking courses, a traditional way to teach while walking, were established, but it was only with the 3rd World Congress of the Comintern and an orientation towards Soviet politics, that worker education really began. From the point of view of the KPD, its supporters had to be politically and intellectually trained, aligned and steeled beyond the previous social-democratic and trade union educational and social goals.

As early as 1932, the MASCH had become increasingly targeted, as state repression by the Nazis was started in earnest. On 25 November 1932, the central building was occupied by Schutzpolizei and several people were arrested and the register of teachers confiscated. House searches of lecturers subsequently followed. On 29 March 1933, the central school room in Berlin was closed by the police. Following this, many teachers from the school emigrated, but many teachers and student stayed to fight the Nazis in Germany.

Goals
 The MASCH saw its tasks in spreading communist ideals. The theoretical foundations of Marxism and emerging Leninism were taught. In other words, the aim was to "create a generally accessible school in which the working population of Berlin should be given the opportunity to learn the basic teachings of unadulterated Marxism and its application to all areas of proletarian life and struggle".
 It was also about disseminating tools for communist agitation and propaganda in the domains of word and art. Interested laypeople were trained in the design and creation of propaganda material by artists from the Association of Revolutionary Visual Artists.
 In addition to the historical or current affairs and politics, discussions were held on medical topics, progress in technology and natural sciences and, of course, community affairs. The school held courses in stenography, typing, Russian and English, social and local politics, law. Lectures were also held on culture, arts, literature, film, radio, photography, theatre, music, natural sciences, medicine, sports, sexuality, children, education, the Soviet Union, foreign languages (including Chinese, Japanese and Esperanto), psychoanalysis and individual psychology, rhetoric, library studies, orthography and grammar, arithmetic and problems of women and young people. Fascism in its Italian and German forms was also analysed time and time again. 
 In individual cases, the MASCH supported foreign visits, such as the 1932 trip to China by the communist sociologist and sinologist Karl August Wittfogel.
 Participants in the MASCH in many cases became members of the KPD, under the impression of training and propaganda.
 The MASCH should reach the widest possible mass throughout Germany. In 1932, there were MASCH offshoots in 36 major German cities, as well as numerous branches in small towns.

MASCH locations

 Mitte in Berlin 
 Bochum
 Brandenburg an der Havel  
 Breslau
 Chemnitz 
 Danzig
 Dessau
 Dresden
 Düsseldorf
 Duisburg 
 Elberfeld
 Erfurt
 Essen
 Frankfurt 
 Gelsenkirchen
 Hagen 
 Halle 
 Hamburg 
 Cologne    
 Königsberg
 Leipzig 
 Nuremberg   
 Recklinghausen
 Remscheid
 Solingen 
 Stuttgart
 Wuppertal

Teachers and lecturers at MASCH
Lecturers and  teachers were, in addition to the employees and functionaries of the KPD, committed politicians, artists and scientists who were open to the labour movement. These included:

 Eduard Ludwig Alexander
 Hilde Benjamin
 Julian Borchardt Lecturer at the school.
 Franz Dahlem
 Philipp Dengel
 Hermann Duncker
 Albert Einstein
 Hanns Eisler
 Karl Ferlemann
 Walter Gropius
 Kurt Hager
 Felix Halle
 Linus Hamann
 John Heartfield
 Fritz Heckert
 Otto Heller
 Georg Henke
 Edwin Hoernle
 Lothar Hofmann
 Bernhard Karlsberg
 Max Keilson
 Egon Erwin Kisch
 Hermann Werner Kubsch
 Jürgen Kuczynski
 Alfred Kurella
 Barbara Lantos
 Georg Lukács
 Kurt Massloff
 Willi Münzenberg
 Alexander Neroslow
 Theodor Neubauer
 Fritz Perls
 Erwin Piscator
 Anni Reich
 Wilhelm Reich
 Ludwig Renn
 Albert Rosenfelder
 Ernest J. Salter
 Diethelm Scheer
 Otto Josef Schlein
 Johann Lorenz Schmidt
 Ernst Schneller
 Max Scholz
 Fritz Schulze
 Anna Seghers
 Manès Sperber
 Bruno Taut
 Helene Weigel
 Erich Weinert
 Karl August Wittfogel
 Friedrich Wolf

Students at MASCH

 Karl von Appen
 Annemarie Balden-Wolff
 Éva Besnyő
 Werner Böhnke
 Bertolt Brecht
 Elfriede Brüning
 Max und Charlotte Burghardt
 Gert Caden
 Eugen Eberle
 Martin Hänisch
 Ernst Hansch
 Bruno Leuschner
 Ludwig Marmulla
 Charlotte Müller
 Erich Rackwitz
 Kurt Schwaen
 Johann Schwert
 Ernst Wolf

Operations
The courses for workers cost only a few Pfennigs with the teachers working free of charge. In order to reach workers who could not regularly attend the courses through home studies, Duncker, Wittfogel and Goldschmidt published the booklets of the Marxist Workers Training (MAS) History of the International Labour Movement and Political Economy.

The Marxist Workers School was obviously quite undogmatic and practical in its approach, describing itself as the university of the working people. It was also used intensively by members of other social groups such as the intelligentsia and apparently nobody was excluded as they all belonged to the bourgeoisie.

The MASCH had 25 students in 1925 and by 1930/1931 had 4000 students. The number of lecturers rose to 160. At one single evening lecture, some 700 were present. In the winter semester of 1929/30 alone, 613 evening lectures were held. In 1932 there were around 2,000 courses. Both the technical staff and the teaching staff worked free of charge. Some of the lecturers were neither KPD members nor bound to a particular political party. The decisive criterion for admission as a MASCH teacher has become more and more: Are you also against fascism?  On the 1932 January edition of the MASCH magazine Der Marxist, the slogan was emblazoned: Against Nazi theories!.

Connections

 Albert Einstein taught at the Marxist Workers School, until his emigration to the United States at the suggestion of Anna Seghers. He was in constant contact with other left-oriented people such as John Heartfield, Egon Erwin Kisch, Jürgen Kuczynski, Willi Münzenberg, Erwin Piscator, Annie Reich and Karl August Wittfogel.
 From 1932, a group of friends and discussions from members of the Berlin Marxist Workers School gathered around the national economist Arvid Harnack and his wife Mildred. These included the former Prussian Minister of Culture Adolf Grimme, the locksmith Karl Behrens, the couple Greta and Adam Kuckhoff and Leo Skrzypczynski, a proprietor of a firm manufacturing Wireless Telegraphy equipment.

Literature
Literature by and of Hermann Duncker:
 
 
 Hermann Duncker: Ausgewählte Schriften und Reden aus sechs Jahrzehnten. Dietz Verlag, Berlin 1984.
 G. Griep, A. Förster, H. Siegel: Hermann Duncker – Lehrer dreier Generationen. Dietz Verlag, Berlin 1976

Other salient literature:

References

External links
 Anregungen zum (selbst)bewussten Leben
 MASCH in Hamburg

1925 in Germany
Educational institutions established in 1925
1925 establishments in Germany
Communist Party of Germany
Marxist organizations
Communist organisations in Germany
Working-class culture